This is a comparison of voice over IP (VoIP) software used to conduct telephone-like voice conversations across Internet Protocol (IP) based networks. For residential markets, voice over IP phone service is often cheaper than traditional public switched telephone network (PSTN) service and can remove geographic restrictions to telephone numbers, e.g., have a PSTN phone number in a New York area code ring in Tokyo.

For businesses, VoIP obviates separate voice and data pipelines, channelling both types of traffic through the IP network while giving the telephony user a range of advanced abilities.

Softphones are client devices for making and receiving voice and video calls over the IP network with the standard functions of most original telephones and usually allow integration with VoIP phones and USB phones instead of using a computer's microphone and speakers (or headset). Most softphone clients run on the open Session Initiation Protocol (SIP) supporting various codecs. Skype runs on a closed proprietary networking protocol but additional business telephone system (PBX) software can allow a SIP based telephone system to connect to the Skype network. Online chat programs now also incorporate voice and video communications.

Other VoIP software applications include conferencing servers, intercom systems, virtual foreign exchange services (FXOs) and adapted telephony software which concurrently support VoIP and public switched telephone network (PSTN) like Interactive Voice Response (IVR) systems, dial in dictation, on hold and call recording servers.

Some entries below are Web-based VoIP; most are standalone Desktop applications.

Desktop applications

Discontinued softphone service

Mobile phones 
For mobile VoIP clients:

Frameworks and libraries

Server software

Secure VoIP software

VoIP software with client-to-client encryption 

The following table is an overview of those VoIP clients which (can) provide end-to-end encryption.

VoIP software with client-to-server encryption 
The following table is an overview of those VoIP clients which (normally) provide client-to-server encryption.

Notes

See also 
 Comparison of audio coding formats
 Comparison of cross-platform instant messaging clients
 Comparison of web conferencing software
 List of codecs
 List of SIP software
 List of video telecommunication services and product brands
 Matrix (protocol)
 Secure communication
 Comparison of user features of messaging platforms

References 

VoIP software
Cryptographic software
VoIP software
VoIP software